William Monypenny may refer to:
 William Flavelle Monypenny (1866–1912), British journalist
 William Monypenny (American football), American football coach